The following lists events that happened during 1973 in Iceland.

Incumbents
President – Kristján Eldjárn 
Prime Minister – Ólafur Jóhannesson

Events

January
 January 23 - Eldfell on Heimaey erupts.

May
 May 18 - Joseph Godber, British Minister of Agriculture, Fisheries and Food, announces that Royal Navy frigates will protect British trawlers fishing in the disputed 50-mile limit round Iceland.

Births

11 January – Andri Steinþór Björnsson, psychologist
4 June – Lárus Sigurðsson, footballer.
14 July – Andri Snær Magnason, writer
14 July – Pétur Marteinsson, footballer

References

 
1970s in Iceland
Iceland
Years of the 20th century in Iceland
Iceland